The Evangelical Lutheran Church in Venezuela (Iglesia Evangélica Luterana en Venezuela) is a Lutheran denomination in Venezuela. It is a member of the Lutheran World Federation, which it joined in 1986. It is a member of the Latin American Council of Churches.

External links 
Lutheran World Federation listing

Lutheran denominations
Lutheranism in South America
Lutheran World Federation members